Marco Antonio Parra Sánchez (born 2 September 1969) is a Peruvian politician and lawyer who served as Interim Mayor of Lima from October 11, 2010 to January 1, 2011, when Luis Castañeda Lossio resigned, who was planning to run in the 2011 presidential election. Parra Sanchez belongs to the National Solidarity.

Biography

He worked in public and private activity until, meeting with a group of supporters and businessmen, they decided to launch the candidacy of Luis Castañeda Lossio for the Presidency of the Republic of Peru in 2000. Since then he has worked together with him in the National Solidarity Party.

He worked at the Cauvi & Benites Law Firm, together with Dr. Enrique Parodi Plaza, deputy of Dr. Raúl Villacorta. Later, as a qualified lawyer, he associated with Carlos Hamman Pastorino, former director of Norsac and former head of the Financial Intelligence Unit of the Peruvian Government, with whom he founded Parra & Hamman, Abogados y Consultores, S.A.C.

From 2002 to October 2010 he served as Lieutenant Mayor of the Municipality of Lima, supporting the management of Luis Castañeda Lossio, until he became the mayor of Lima due to the resignation of Luis Castañeda to run as a candidate for the Presidency of the Republic.

He unsuccessfully ran for a seat in the Congress of the Republic in the 2006 elections.

Mayor of Lima 
Marco Parra took office as mayor on 11 October 2010, following the resignation of Luis Castañeda Lossio who was planning to run in the 2011 presidential election. After the elections in October 2010, he was succeeded on 1 January 2011 by Susana Villarán.

References 

1969 births
Living people
Mayors of Lima
People from Lima
National Solidarity Party (Peru) politicians